Harmony Hammond (born February 8, 1944) is an American artist, activist, curator, and writer. She was a prominent figure in the founding of the feminist art movement in 1970s New York.

Early life and education 
Harmony Hammond was born on February 8, 1944, in Hometown, Illinois. At 17, Hammond attended Miliken University in Decatur, Illinois. Later, she moved to Minneapolis and enrolled at the University of Minnesota. Hammond graduated with a B.A. of Arts in painting in 1967.

Career
Hammond and her husband moved to New York in 1969, just months after the Stonewall Riots. When Hammond found out she was pregnant with her daughter, she and her husband decided to part ways. In 1973, Hammond came out as a lesbian.

Harmony Hammond co-founded the A.I.R. Gallery in 1972; it was the first women's cooperative art gallery in New York. She also co-founded Heresies: A Feminist Publication of Art and Politics in 1976, co-edited issues #1, 3 and 9, and published articles in seven issues. Heresies was founded by Heresies Collective, whose core group consisted of Joyce Kozloff, Miriam Schapiro, Joan Semmel, Lucy Lippard, Mary Beth Edelson, Nancy Spero, and Harmony Hammond. She was an instructor at the New York Feminist Art Institute.

Hammond curated A Lesbian Show in 1978 at 112 Greene Street Workshop, featuring works by lesbian artists. She was one of the featured artists in the "Great American Lesbian Art Show" at the Woman's Building in 1980. In 1981, Hammond curated and exhibited her work in Home Work: The Domestic Environment As Reflected in the Work of Women Artists, sponsored by the New York State Council of the Arts (NYSCA) and The Women's Hall of Fame, Seneca Falls, NY. She also curated an exhibition in 1999 at Plan B Evolving Arts in Santa Fe titled Out West, bringing together 41 lesbian, gay, bisexual, transgender and two-spirit artists from the Southwest.

Hammond authored her first book, Wrappings: Essays on Feminism, Art, and the Martial Arts, a corpus of her writings from 1973 to 1983 published by TSL Press, in 1984. In 2000 she published Lesbian Art in America: A Contemporary History. She is featured in two 2010 films on feminist art - The Heretics, directed by Joan Braderman which focuses on the founders of the magazines Heresies: A Feminist Publication of Art and Politics in 1976; and !Women Art Revolution, directed by Lynn Hershman Leeson.

In 1984, she moved to New Mexico, where she lives and works today. As a tenured full professor, Hammond taught painting, combined media and graduate critiques at the University of Arizona in Tucson, from 1988 to 2005. Hammond continues to teach workshops and writes, curates, and lectures on feminist, lesbian, and queer art.

Works

In her art, Hammond asserts that traditionally feminine qualities are worthwhile artistic subjects and means for artistic creation. To this end, for example, she created sculptures in the early 1970s featuring swaths of fabric, a traditionally feminine material, as a primary material. There were four fabric series: Bags (1971), Presences (1972), Floorpieces (1973), and Wrapped Sculptures (1977-1984). Harmony Hammond's paintings themselves show how they were made and are almost all abstract. In the 1990s Hammond primarily made mixed-media installations that incorporated a range of traditionally non-art materials (such as human hair and corrugated roofing) with traditional oil painting, and in the first decade of the 2000s, her focus was on making monochrome abstract paintings.

Presences 
This was a series of works created in 1971–1972. It was her first major series. Seven of these pieces are included in her Material Witness collection. These artworks are fabric scraps soaked in paint, densely sewn together and on a hanger strung from the ceiling. Presences was presented at Harmony Hammond's first solo exhibition in New York in 1973. The fabric is all different lengths with some strips being layered or tied together to be longer. "Six fabric sculptures appearing slightly larger than life size hang from the ceiling and graze the floor, inviting viewers to join them. Paint applied by artist Harmony Hammond imparts earthy tones to these layered scraps of cloth. Spots of bright color and pattern peek out here and there—plaids, polka dots, florals." Hammond's intention behind the works was to capture the history of women being creative and claiming space. Most of the fabric scraps used to create the pieces in the Presences series were sourced from members of a women's group Hammond was involved with.

Floorpieces 
In 1973, Hammond created a series of artworks titled Floorpieces. Hammond created these rugs through a traditional braiding style with colorful, remnant fabric she had found in dumpsters in New York's garment district. The rag-rugs were then painted selectively with acrylic pigment and were displayed on the ground like rugs. Most of Hammond's Floorpieces were approximately 5 ft. (1.5 m) in diameter and almost 2 in. (5 cm) thick. The size and detail of Hammond's artwork is hard to obtain from reproductions and photographs, therefore insisting on the importance of a present viewer. Hammond's Floorpieces challenged the binary between Art and Craft; they also continued the artist's exploration of the space between painting and sculpture. The creation of the Floorpieces coincided with Hammond coming out as a lesbian.

Near Monochromes 
Throughout the 1990s and early 2000s, Hammond's work began to include fewer sculptural elements, taking on more traditionally painterly forms and focusing more heavily on partially hidden forms beneath layers of paint. Regarding the evolution of her work, Hammond stated: "Over the years, the paintings have gotten simpler, more condensed, with fewer materials in any given piece." The works include materials such as "straps, grommets, bandage-like strips of cloth, or rough burlap patches with fraying edges and pronounced seams."

Recognition 
Hammond has had more than 40 solo exhibitions internationally. Her works have been shown in the Tucson Museum of Art, Museum of Contemporary Art, Gemeentemuseum Den Haag, the Vancouver Art Gallery, National Academy Museum, and Museo Tamayo. Her works are also included in permanent collections in the Metropolitan Museum of Art, the Walker Art Center, the Brooklyn Museum, the National Museum of Women in the Arts, the Art Institute of Chicago, the New Mexico Museum of Art, and the Wadsworth Atheneum.

She has received fellowships from the National Endowment of the Arts, the Rockefeller Foundation, the John Simon Guggenheim Memorial Foundation, the Adolph and Esther Gottlieb Foundation, and the Pollock-Krasner Foundation among others. In 2013, the Women's Caucus for Art announced that Hammond would be one of the 2014 recipients of the organization's Lifetime Achievement Award. The Harmony Hammond Papers were acquired by the Getty Research Institute, Los Angeles in 2016.

Harmony Hammond: Material Witness, Five Decades of Art, Hammond's first comprehensive museum survey, took place at the Aldrich Museum in Ridgefield, Connecticut. The exhibit traveled to the Sarasota Art Museum in Sarasota, Florida, in 2020. The exhibit was accompanied by the first hardcover monograph written on Hammond's work, with an essay by the exhibit's curator, Amy Smith-Stewart.

Public collections 

 Art Institute of Chicago, IL
 Brooklyn Museum, Brooklyn, NY
 Denver Art Museum, Denver, CO
 Everson Museum, Syracuse, NY
 Grey Art Gallery, New York University, New York, NY
 Leslie-Lohman Museum, New York, NY
 Library of Congress, Washington, DC
 Lyman Allyn Art Museum, New London, CT
 Metropolitan Museum of Art, New York, NY
 Minneapolis Institute of Arts, Minneapolis, MN
 Museum of Contemporary Art, Los Angeles, CA
 The Museum of Modern Art, New York, NY
 National Museum of Women in the Arts, Washington, DC
 New Mexico Arts, State Public Art Collection, NM
 New Mexico Museum of Art, Santa Fe, NM
 Orlando Museum of Art, FL
 Phoenix Art Museum, AZ
 Smithsonian American Art Museum
 Tucson Museum of Art, AZ University of New Mexico Art Museum, Albuquerque, NM
 Wadsworth Atheneum Museum of Art, Hartford, CT
 Walker Art Center, Minneapolis, MN
 Weatherspoon Art Museum, University of North Carolina, Greensboro, NC
 Weisman Museum, University of Minnesota, Minneapolis, MN
 Whitney Museum of American Art, New York, NY

References

Further reading 

 Bryan-Wilson, Julia (2017). Fray: Art + Textile Politics. Chicago: The University of Chicago Press. 
 Chaich, John (2017). Queer Threads: Crafting Identity and Community. Los Angeles, CA: Ammo. 
 Hammond, Harmony (2000). Lesbian Art in America: A Contemporary History. New York: Rizzoli. 
 Hammond, Harmony (1984). Wrappings : essays on feminism, art, and the martial arts. New York: TSL Press.

External links

Official website
Harmony Hammond bio in glbtq: an encyclopedia of gay, lesbian, bisexual, transgender, and queer culture
Hammond's gallery, Alexander Gray 
Harmony Hammond prints at 10 Grand Press
Harmony Hammond on her 2019 exhibit at the White Cube Gallery
Oral history interview with Harmony Hammond

Feminist artists
1944 births
Living people
Artists from Chicago
Artists from New Mexico
University of Minnesota College of Liberal Arts alumni
University of Arizona faculty
LGBT people from Illinois
20th-century American women artists
20th-century American artists
20th-century textile artists
21st-century American women artists
21st-century American artists
21st-century textile artists
Textile artists
Women textile artists
American textile artists
Heresies Collective members
American women academics
American lesbian artists